Max Woiski Sr. (February 11, 1911 – January 31, 1981) was a Surinamese musician.

Career
Woiski started to make popular music in the 1930s in Amsterdam. In his own club La Cubana in Amsterdam, he performed under the name "José Baretto" and mainly participated in Latin American music with his orchestra. In the 1950s, he switched to Surinamese music. His biggest hit was B.B. met R. (Brown beans and rice).

In the 1960s, he had his own production company MMP, for which records were produced by CNR Records. Notable artists who were signed by Woiski include Ciska Peters and Edwin Rutten. At the end of the 1960s, Woiski left for Mallorca, where he bought a nightclub. Here he performed with his orchestra for years. He died in 1981.

His son Max Woiski Jr., brought to the Netherlands by his father when he needed a guitarist in his orchestra, started the nightclub La Tropicana in Amsterdam after his father's departure. His music was also very popular in the Netherlands. His granddaughter Lils Mackintosh is a jazz and blues singer.

Discography
Albums
Successen (1973)
Bigi Brasa (1998)
Ritmo Tropical (2011)

References

1911 births
1981 deaths
People from Wanica District
Surinamese composers
Surinamese musicians
Surinamese emigrants to the Netherlands